Trapelus rubrigularis, the red-throated agama, is a species of agama found in Pakistan.

References

Trapelus
Lizards of Asia
Taxa named by William Thomas Blanford
Reptiles described in 1875